This is a list of New Zealand people, some or all of whose ancestors originated in China.

Politics 

 Peter Chin, lawyer, Mayor of Dunedin; 'Old Generation' Cantonese New Zealander
 Meng Foon, Mayor of Gisborne; 'Old Generation' Cantonese New Zealander
 Raymond Huo, Member of Parliament 2008–2014 and since 2017; first-generation mainland Chinese
 Pansy Wong, New Zealand's first ethnic Chinese MP 1996–2011; first Asian MP and first Asian Cabinet Minister; 1970s generation Hong Kong migrant New Zealander of Shanghai heritage
Kenneth Wang, former ACT party MP 2004–2005; came to New Zealand in 1986; graduated from Auckland University with a master's degree in fine Arts in 1988; founder of advertising and media agency Brandwork
Dr Jian Yang, New Zealand MP

Arts 

 Geeling Ng, model and actress, born in 1960 in New Zealand; known for Mad Max Beyond Thunderdome (1985), Illustrious Energy (1988) and Desperate Remedies (1993)
 Raven Tao, model, television host, actress and former radio DJ based in Hong Kong
 Bic Runga, singer/songwriter, of Māori (indigenous New Zealander) and Chinese Malaysian parentage
 Boh Runga, New Zealand recording artist; lead singer and guitarist in New Zealand rock band Stellar; older sister of Bic Runga and Pearl Runga, who are also musicians
 Li Ming Hu, known for her role as Li Mei Chen on New Zealand's popular TV show Shortland Street; second-generation New Zealander of Singaporean and Taiwanese parentage
 Raybon Kan, comedian, second-generation New Zealander of Mainland Chinese parentage
 Wing, singer, emigrated from Hong Kong
 Ant Sang, comic book artist and graphic designer, best known for his work on the Bro'Town television series and the graphic novel Shaolin Burning
 Roseanne Liang, filmmaker; writer and director of the feature film My Wedding and Other Secrets and the short film Banana in a Nutshell
 Yoson An (born 1992), actor, born in Macau
 Michelle Ang (born 1983), New Zealand film and television actress; regular cast member on the Australian show Neighbours, won "Best Actress in A Feature Film" at New Zealand Film and Television Awards 2011 for My Wedding and Other Secrets
 Brent Wong (born 1945), painter, born in New Zealand

Sports 
 Li Chunli, gold medal-winning table tennis champion, 1980s generation migrant New Zealander and Mainland Chinese
  Tyla Nathan-Wong, New Zealand Women's Sevens (2012–14); Maori Women's Sevens (2012); Auckland Women's Sevens (2012–13); NZ Women's Touch team (2010–present); NZ U19 Women's Touch Team (2011)
  Pat Lam (born 1968), New Zealand-born rugby union coach of Samoan and Chinese/Hong Kong descent.
  Ben Lam (born 1991), nephew of Pat. Competed internationally for the New Zealand Men's Sevens (2012-2016). Currently plays wing for the Hurricanes of Super Rugby. Grew up in Kowloon Hong Kong.
  Nigel Ah Wong also known as Nigel Lam Ah Wong, center/wing for Counties Manukau and Top League Kobelco Steelers. Ah Wong is a cousin of Ben and nephew of Pat.

Journalists and writers 
 Chiu Kwok-chun (1884-1957), journalist, political reformer, newspaper editor, baptist missionary and community leader. 
 Tze Ming Mok (莫志明), cultural commentator, blogger and literary writer; second generation New Zealander of Chinese Singaporean and Malaysian parentage
 Alison Wong (born 1960), 'Old Generation' Cantonese; poet and fiction writer; born in Hastings, New Zealand;
Chris Tse, writer and poet. Author of How to be Dead in a Year of Snakes and He's So MASC.
Jack Yan (甄爵恩), graphic designer and publisher of fashion magazine Lucire; 1.5 generation Hong Kong migrant New Zealander; pioneer in font software; new-media fashion publishing

Business people 
 Tom Ah Chee co-founder of the Foodtown supermarket chain and Georgie Pie fast food restaurant chain
 Chew Chong (born between 1827 and 1844), merchant
 Appo Hocton (黃鶴庭）(c.1823–26 September 1920), Chinese-born New Zealand servant, landlord, carter and farmer
Charles Sew Hoy (徐肇開 )(1836–1901), merchant, gold prospector, and Chinese leader
 Mai Chen, prominent constitutional lawyer; chair of the short-lived Pan Asian Congress of 2002; 1970s generation and 1.5 generation Taiwanese migrant New Zealander
 Ron Sang (方勵涵 )architect, art collector, art exhibitor and publisher of New Zealand art books

References